The Kyunghyang Shinmun or Kyonghyang Sinmun is a major daily newspaper published in South Korea. It is based in Seoul. The name literally means Urbi et Orbi Daily News.

History
Kyunghyang Shinmun was founded in 1946 by the Catholic Church, which explains its name. Before the Korean War, it was edited by Fr. Peter Ryang, a refugee from the North, and its circulation was 100,000. Kyunghyang Shinmun was temporarily closed down in May 1959 by the Rhee administration on grounds of having printed "false editorials", but revived after the pro-democracy April Revolution of 1960. As of today, the newspaper is no longer associated with the Catholic Church. 

In 1974, Kyunghyang Shinmun joined forces with Munhwa Broadcasting Corporation (MBC), thus forming the new Munhwa Broadcasting-Kyunghyang Shinmun Company. The partnership lasted until 1981, when the two companies were separated due to the Basic Press Act.

It later came to be owned by the Hanwha chaebol in 1990, but Hanwha relinquished its control of the newspaper after the 1997 Asian financial crisis, at the same time as Hanhwa's competitor Hyundai gave up its own daily, the Munhwa Ilbo.

Current operations
In 1998, Kyunghyang Shinmun became an independent newspaper with employee ownership. The CEO is elected by the employees; the editor-in-chief, though appointed by the CEO, must be approved by a majority of the journalist-employees.

The newspaper employs 600 people, including 240 journalists and maintains foreign bureaus in Washington, D.C., Tokyo and Beijing. It reports 1.3 million daily visitors to its website and 6.2 million daily page-views. The company also publishes a daily sports newspaper (Sports Kyunghyang), a weekly news magazine (The Jugan Kyunghyang) and a monthly lifestyle magazine for women (The Lady Kyunghyang).

The Hankyoreh and Kyunghyang Shinmun are generally considered "liberal" or "moderate progressive".

See also
 List of newspapers in South Korea

References

External links
 Official site 
 Official site 

Korean-language newspapers
Centrist newspapers
Liberal media in South Korea
Mass media in Seoul
Newspapers published in South Korea
Publications established in 1946